Frumenty (sometimes frumentee, furmity, fromity, or fermenty) was a popular dish in Western European medieval cuisine. It is a porridge, a thick boiled grain dish—hence its name, which derives from the Latin word frumentum, "grain". It was usually made with cracked wheat boiled with either milk or broth and was a peasant staple. More luxurious recipes include eggs, almonds, currants, sugar, saffron and orange flower water. Frumenty was served with meat as a pottage, traditionally with venison or even porpoise (considered a "fish" and therefore appropriate for Lent). It was also frequently used as a subtlety, a dish between courses at a banquet.

In England

History
Florence White, founder of the English Folk Cookery Association, wrote in Good Things in England (1932) that frumenty is England's "oldest national dish". For several centuries, frumenty was part of the traditional Celtic Christmas meal. According to an 1822 Time's Telescope, in Yorkshire, on Christmas Eve:

It was often eaten on Mothering Sunday, the fourth Sunday of Lent, in late spring. On that day many servants were allowed to visit their mothers and were often served frumenty to celebrate and give them a wholesome meal to prepare them for their return journey.  The use of eggs would have been a brief respite from the Lenten fast. In Lincolnshire, frumenty was associated with sheep-shearing in June. A diarist recalled of his youth in the 1820s that "almost every farmer in the village made a large quantity of frumenty on the morning they began to clip; and every child in the village was invited to partake of it".   A second batch, of better quality, was produced later and taken round in buckets to every house in the village.

Food historian Polly Russell describes one of the first English recipes for it in the 1390 manuscript The Forme of Cury, and how this served as the inspiration for the 2013 Christmas menu at Dinner by Heston Blumenthal, transforming Victorian workhouse food for paupers into modern luxurious dining.

Literary references
Frumentee is served with venison at a banquet in the mid-14th century North Midlands poem Wynnere and Wastoure: "Venyson with the frumentee, and fesanttes full riche / Baken mete therby one the burde sett", i.e. in modern English, "Venison with the frumenty and pheasants full rich; baked meat by it on the table set".  The dish also appears, likewise paired with venison, at the New Year feast in the Middle English poem known as The Alliterative Morte Arthure (c.1400): "Flesh flourisht of fermison, with frumentee noble."

The dish, described as 'furmity' and served with fruit and a slug of rum added under the counter, plays a role in the plot of Thomas Hardy's novel The Mayor of Casterbridge. It is also mentioned in Lewis Carroll's Through the Looking-Glass as a food that snapdragon flies live on. Snapdragon was a popular game at Christmas, and Carroll's mention of frumenty shows it was known to him as a holiday food. And it appears in a girl's recitation of holiday traditions, in My Lady Ludlow, published 1858, by Elizabeth Gaskell: "furmenty on Mothering Sunday, Violet cakes in Passion Week." (Chapter 2)

Recipes
Steve Roud, librarian and folklorist, compiled a compendium of The English Year including three recipes for frumenty. They show considerable variation with place and time.

A healthy dose of spirit is often mentioned as accompanying the frumenty.

Elsewhere
A dish made with boiled cracked wheat and soured milk was made in Ancient Persia, and is still used, often as the basis for a soup, in Greece and Cyprus (as trahanas), and in Turkey (tarhana). Kutia is an Eastern European dish to a similar recipe.

See also

 , whole wheat eaten as a food

References

Further reading
Black, William (2005) The Land that Thyme Forgot Bantam. ; p. 346
Adamson, Melitta Weiss (2004) Food in Medieval Times

External links
Middle Ages recipes 

Puddings
Porridges
Medieval cuisine
English cuisine
Christmas food
Wheat dishes